The 2020 Alsco Uniforms 500 was a NASCAR Cup Series race scheduled to be held on May 27, 2020, but run on May 28, 2020 due to Tropical Depression Bertha at Charlotte Motor Speedway in Concord, North Carolina, replacing Sonoma Raceway event. Contested over 208 laps on the 1.5 mile (2.42 km) asphalt speedway, it was the eighth race of the 2020 NASCAR Cup Series season.

The first two stages were 60 laps each, and the final was 88.

Report

Background

The race was held at Charlotte Motor Speedway, which is located in Concord, North Carolina. The speedway complex includes a  quad-oval track that will be utilized for the race, as well as a dragstrip and a dirt track. The speedway was built in 1959 by Bruton Smith and is considered the home track for NASCAR with many race teams based in the Charlotte metropolitan area. The track is owned and operated by Speedway Motorsports Inc. (SMI) with Marcus G. Smith serving as track president.

Entry list
 (R) denotes rookie driver.
 (i) denotes driver who are ineligible for series driver points.

Qualifying
William Byron was awarded the pole for the race as determined by the top 20 from Sunday's finishing order inverted.

Starting Lineup

Race

Stage Results

Stage One
Laps: 55

Stage Two
Laps: 60

Final Stage Results

Stage Three
Laps: 93

Race statistics
 Lead changes: 15 among 8 different drivers
 Cautions/Laps: 7 for 37
 Red flags: 1 for 1 hour, 14 minutes and 2 seconds
 Time of race: 2 hours, 29 minutes and 23 seconds
 Average speed:

Media

Television
The Alsco Uniforms 500 was carried by FS1 in the United States. Mike Joy and five-time Charlotte winner Jeff Gordon covered the race from the Fox Sports studio in Charlotte. Vince Welch handled the pit road duties. Larry McReynolds provided insight from the Fox Sports studio in Charlotte.

Radio
Radio coverage of the race was broadcast by the Performance Racing Network (PRN), and was simulcasted on Sirius XM NASCAR Radio. Doug Rice and Mark Garrow called the race in the booth when the field raced through the quad-oval. Rob Albright reported the race from a billboard in turn 2 when the field was racing through turns 1 and 2 and halfway down the backstretch. Pat Patterson called the race from a billboard outside of turn 3 when the field raced through the other half of the backstretch and through turns 3 and 4. Brad Gillie, Brett McMillan and Wendy Venturini were the pit reporters during the broadcast.

Standings after the race

Drivers' Championship standings

Manufacturers' Championship standings

Note: Only the first 16 positions are included for the driver standings.
. – Driver has clinched a position in the NASCAR Cup Series playoffs.

References

Alsco Uniforms 500
Alsco Uniforms 500
Alsco Uniforms 500
NASCAR races at Charlotte Motor Speedway